The 2017–18 Ethiopian Higher League is the second-tier football in Ethiopia. The season began play on 18 November 2017.

On September 4, 2018 Debub Police (winner of Group B) beat Bahir Dar Kenema (winner of Group A) 1-0 in the championship match and were crowned champions of the 2017–18 Ethiopian Higher League.

A playoff match was held in Hawassa, Ethiopia between Shire Endaselassie and Jimma Aba Buna to decide the third and final team promoted to the 2018–19 Ethiopian Premier League, a match Shire Endaselassie won by a final score of 2-1.

League table

2017-18 Ethiopian Higher League Group A (2010 ከፍተኛ ሊግ ምድብ ሀ)

2017-18 Ethiopian Higher League Group B (2010 ከፍተኛ ሊግ ምድብ ለ)

References

Football leagues in Ethiopia
Foot
Foot
Ethio